The Islamic Party of Azerbaijan ( or AİP) is a banned Islamist party in Azerbaijan. The party was founded in 1991 in the town of Nardaran, which lies northeast of the capital Baku on the Absheron Peninsula, and is a lone stronghold of conservative Shi'a Islam in staunchly secular and religiously progressive Azerbaijan, and was officially registered in 1992. Its registration, however, was cancelled in 1995, and has not been reinstated since.

It advocated stronger ties with Iran and even proclaiming the state of Azerbaijan into an Islamic Republic as it rejected the ideas of pan-Turkism, regarding them as dangerous and utopian. Nevertheless it was also an Azerbaijani nationalist party and was known for its fiery nationalist and anti-Armenian rhetoric and frequently advocated a military solution to the Nagorno-Karabakh conflict which is partly under Armenian occupation. It was fiercely opposed and advocated a ban of proselytism and Christian missionary activities.

The party was also anti-US, anti-Zionist and anti-EU and supported Hezbollah and its leader Hassan Nasrallah.

In 1995, the government of Azerbaijan accused the Islamic Party of Azerbaijan of being covertly financed by Iran, which Azerbaijan regarded as an interference in its domestic affairs, and which is illegal under Azerbaijani law. Therefore, the leaders of the party were arrested and the Islamic Party of Azerbaijan was officially banned. Subsequently under the updated secular laws of Azerbaijan, Islamist parties and the formation of Islamist parties were banned.

On 7 October 2011, Samadov was sentenced to 12 years in prison on charges of attempts to set up a criminal group to plan terror attacks and to overthrow the government.

See also 
 Islam in Azerbaijan
 Religion in Azerbaijan

References

External links 
  

1991 establishments in Azerbaijan
1995 disestablishments in Azerbaijan
Banned Islamist parties
Defunct political parties in Azerbaijan
Islamic organizations based in Azerbaijan
Islamic political parties
Political parties disestablished in 1995
Political parties established in 1991